Abner is both a surname and a given name. In the United States, it was moderately popular as a given name, but declined in the first half of the 20th century, rarely being used for newborns after the 1930s. The best known is Abner from the Bible (Book of Samuel), first cousin to Saul and commander-in-chief of his army. Other notable people with the name include:

Given name
Abnér (died 760), Irish abbot
Abner of Burgos (c. 1270-c. 1347 or a little later), Jewish philosopher, convert to Christianity and polemical writer against his former religion
Abner Biberman (1909–1977), American actor, director and screenwriter
Abner Coburn (1803–1885), 30th governor of Maine
Abner Cole (1783–1835), American newspaper editor
Abner Cook (1814-1884), Texas architect and general contractor
Abner Cotto (born 1987), Puerto Rican boxer
Abner Dalrymple (1857-1939), American Major League Baseball player
Abner Dean (1910–1982), American cartoonist
Abner Doble (1890–1961), American mechanical engineer who built and sold steam-powered automobiles
Abner Doubleday (1819-1893), American Civil War Union Army general often erroneously credited with inventing baseball
Abner Felipe (born 1996), Brazilian footballer
Abner C. Harding (1807-1874), member of Congress, U.S. Representative from Illinois and Union Army brigadier general during the American Civil War
Abner Haynes (born 1937), American former college and American Football League player
Abner Hazeltine (1793–1879), American politician, U.S. Representative from New York and lawyer
Abner Jay (1921–1993), American multi-instrument musician
Abner Jones (1772–1841), minister and early church reformer in the United States
Abner Kneeland (1774–1844), American radical evangelist and theologian, the last man jailed in the United States for blasphemy
Abner Lacock (1770–1837), American politician, Senator from Pennsylvania, Pennsylvania Militia brigadier general, surveyor and civil engineer
Abner Lewis (1801-1879), U.S. Representative from New York, judge and attorney
Abner Smith Lipscomb (1789-1856), Secretary of State for the Republic of Texas, lawyer and judge
Abner Louima (born 1966), Haitian-American victim of police brutality
Abner Mares (born 1985), Mexican boxer who won several world championship titles
Abner Reid McClelan (1831-1917), Canadian politician
Abner J. Mikva (born 1926), American former U.S. Representative from Illinois, White House Counsel, federal judge and law professor
Abner Nash (1740–1786), second Governor of North Carolina, representative in the Continental Congress and lawyer
Abner Pākī (c. 1808–1855), Hawaiian chief
Abner Monroe Perrin (1827-1864), Confederate general in the American Civil War
Abner Powell (1860-1953), American Major League Baseball player, manager and team owner
Abner Read (1821–1863), United States Navy officer killed in the American Civil War
Abner Shimony (born 1928), American physicist and philosopher of science
Abner W. Sibal (1921-2000), American politician and U.S. Representative from Connecticut
Abner Silver (1899-1966), American songwriter
Abner Taylor (1829-1903), U.S. Representative from Illinois and businessman
Abner Vinícius (born 2000), Brazilian footballer
Abner Wilcox (1808–1869), American missionary teacher in the Kingdom of Hawaii
Abner Wimberly (1926-1976), American football player
Abner Zwillman (1904-1959), Jewish-American gangster

Surname
David Abner Sr. (1826–1902), American legislator and former slave
Douglas Abner (born 1996), Brazilian footballer
Ewart Abner (1923-1997), American record company executive
Shawn Abner (born 1966), American former Major League Baseball player
Seth Abner (born 1995), better known as Scump, American professional Call of Duty player, son of Shawn Abner

Fictional characters
Abner Brown, the villain of John Masefield's novel The Box of Delights
Abner Jenkins, a villain in Marvel Comics
Abner Kravitz, neighbor to central character Samantha Stephens in the 1960s sitcom Bewitched, played by George Tobias
Abner Krill, aka the Polka-Dot Man, a villain in DC Comics 
Abner Marsh, the protagonist of George R. R. Martin's novel Fevre Dream
Abner Peabody, a character in the Lum and Abner American radio program (1931–1954)
Abner Ravenwood, father of Marion Ravenwood
Abner Yokum, title character of the American comic strip L'il Abner

See also
Avenir (given name), a related Russian male first name

Masculine given names